Vrindavan, also spelt Vrindaban and Brindaban, is a historical city in the Mathura district of Uttar Pradesh, India. It is located in the Braj Bhoomi region and holds religious importance in Hinduism as Krishna spent most of his childhood days in this city. Vrindavan has about 5,500 temples dedicated to the worship of Krishna and his divine consort Radha. 

It is one of the most sacred places for Vaishnavism tradition. Vrindavan is a significant part of the "Krishna pilgrimage circuit" which also includes Mathura, Barsana, Gokul, Govardhan, Kurukshetra, Dwarka and Puri.

Etymology 

Geography 
It has an average elevation of 170 metres (557 feet).

Yamuna river flows through the city. It is located 125 km away from Delhi and 15 km away from Mathura City.

Climate

Demographics 
As of 2011 Indian Census, Vrindavan had a total population of 63,005, of which 34,769 were males and 28,236 were females. Population within the age group of 0 to 6 years was 7,818. The total number of literates in Vrindavan was 42,917, which constituted 68.11% of the population with male literacy of 73.7% and female literacy of 61.2%. The effective literacy rate of 7+ population of Vrindavan was 77.8%, of which male literacy rate was 83.7% and female literacy rate was 70.3%. The sex ratio is 812 females per 1000 males. The Scheduled Castes and Scheduled Tribes population was 6,294 and 18, respectively. Vrindavan had 11,637 households in 2011.

Vrindavan lies in the cultural region of Braj.

Religious heritage 

Vrindavan is considered to be a sacred place for Vaisnavism tradition of Hinduism. The other prominent areas surrounding Vrindavan are Govardhana, Gokul, Nandgaon, Barsana, Mathura and Bhandirvan. Along with Vrindavan, all these places are considered to be the center of Radha and Krishna worship. Millions of devotees of Radha Krishna visit Vrindavan and its nearby areas every year to participate in number of festivals. The common salutation or greetings used in Braj region by its residents is Radhe Radhe which is associated with the Goddess Radha or Hare Krishna which is associated with Krishna.

Religious Significance
Vrindavan is considered to be the place where Krishna spent part of his childhood.

Devotees of Krishna believe that he visits the town each night to adore Radha.

History 

Vrindavan has an ancient past, associated with Hindu culture and history, and was established in the 16th and 17th centuries as a result of an explicit treaty between Muslims and Hindu Emperors, and is an important Hindu pilgrimage site since long.

Of the contemporary times, Vallabhacharya, aged eleven visited Vrindavan. Later on, he performed three pilgrimages of India, barefoot giving discourses on Bhagavad Gita at 84 places. These 84 places are known as Pushtimarg Baithak and since then are the places of pilgrimage. Yet, he stayed in Vrindavan for four months each year. Vrindavan thus heavily influenced his formation of Pushtimarg.

The essence of Vrindavan was lost over time until the 16th century, when it was rediscovered by Chaitanya Mahaprabhu. In the year 1515, Chaitanya Mahaprabhu visited Vrindavan, with the purpose of locating the lost holy places associated with Krishna's life.

In the last 250 years, the extensive forests of Vrindavan have been subjected to urbanization, first by local Rajas and in recent decades by apartment developers. The forest cover has been whittled away to only a few remaining spots, and the local wildlife, including peacocks, cows, monkeys and a variety of bird species has been virtually eliminated.

Temples 

Vrindavan, the land of Radha Krishna has about 5500 temples dedicated to them to showcase their divine pastimes. Some of the important pilgrimage sites are -
Shri Radha Madan Mohan Temple, located near the Kalidah Ghat was built by Kapur Ram Das of Multan. One of the oldest temples in Vrindavan, it is closely associated with Chaitanya Mahaprabhu. The original deity of Madan Gopal was shifted from the shrine to Karauli in Rajasthan for safekeeping during Aurangzeb's rule. Today, a replica of the original (deity) is worshipped at the temple
Sri Radha Raman Mandir, constructed at the request of Gopala Bhatta Goswami and houses a saligram deity of Krishna as Radha Ramana, alongside Radha.
Banke Bihari Temple, built in 1862 after the image of Banke-Bihari was discovered in Nidhivan by Swami Haridas.
Radha Vallabh Temple is one of the ancient temple of Vrindavan. It was constructed in 1585 AD and was the first temple made up of red sandstones.
Radha Damodar Temple is a Gaudiya Vaishnavism temple, which is dedicated to Radha Krishna and was constructed in 1542 CE.
Sri Krishna-Balarama Temple was built by the International Society for Krishna Consciousness (ISKCON) in Raman-Reti. The principal deities of this temple are Krishna and Balaram, with Radha–Shyamasundar and Gaura-Nitai alongside. Adjoining the temple is the samadhi of A. C. Bhaktivedanta Swami Prabhupada, the founder of ISKCON, built in pure white marble.
Prem Mandir is a spiritual complex situated on a 54-acre site on the outskirts of Vrindavan dedicated to divine love. The temple structure was established by spiritual guru Kripalu Maharaj. The main structure built in marble and figures of Krishna cover the main temple.
Vrindavan Chandrodaya Mandir is housed in a modern geodesic structure with a traditional gopuram based on Khajuraho style of architecture. It is being built by one of the ISKCON factions based in Bangalore. At cost of  it will be the tallest temple in world on completion.

Transportation

Road
Vrindavan is well connected by roads and is connected to Delhi by National Highway (NH) 44 of the Golden Quadrilateral network. Earlier it was NH 2.

129 km from New Delhi

117 km from Gurgaon

54 km from Agra

9 km from Mathura

While in Vrindavan, battery powered e-rickshaw are available for commuting within city-limits.

Rail
BDB/Vrindavan is on the Mathura-Vrindavan MG link.
VRBD/Vrindavan Road is on the Agra-Delhi chord.

Flight 
Nearest Airports are Agra Airport and New Delhi International Airport.

City of Widows 
Vrindavan is also known as the "city of widows" due to the large number of widows who move into the town and surrounding area after losing their husbands. There are an estimated 15,000 to 20,000 widows. The widows come from states of West Bengal, Assam and Odisha. Many spend time singing bhajan hymns at bhajanashrams. An organization called Guild of Service was formed to assist these deprived women and children. According to a survey report prepared by the government, several homes run by the government and different NGOs for widows.

Gallery

See also 
 
Gokul
Mathura
Barsana
Nandgaon
Radha Kund
Kusum Sarovar
Radha Rani Temple
Banke Bihari Temple
Radha Raman Temple
Radha Madan Mohan Temple, Vrindavan
Nidhivan
Radha Krishna

References

External links 

 
Krishna
Cities and towns in Mathura district
Vaishnavism
Sacred groves
Widowhood in India
Yamuna River
Rigvedic rivers
Hinduism
Krishna temples
Locations in Hindu mythology
Holy cities
Hindu holy cities
Hindu pilgrimages
Hindu pilgrimage sites in India
Religious tourism in India
Ancient Indian cities